Rear Admiral Sanjay Bhalla, NM is a serving Flag officer in the Indian Navy. He last served as the Flag Officer Commanding Eastern Fleet, having taken over from Rear Admiral Tarun Sobti in December 2021.

Naval career 
Bhalla was commissioned into the Indian Navy on 1 January 1989. He is a specialist in Communication and Electronic Warfare. He attended the Defence Services Staff College, Wellington and the College of Naval Warfare in Mumbai. He also attended the Royal College of Defence Studies, London.

Bhalla has commanded the Veer-class missile vessel , and the Nilgiri-class anti-submarine warfare frigate . He subsequently commanded the Brahmaputra-class guided-missile frigate .

Bhalla, in his staff appointments, has served as the training commander at the Indian Naval Academy. He also served as the Director at Maritime Doctrine and Concepts Centre. As a Captain, he served as the Naval adviser at the High Commission of India, Islamabad. As a Commodore, he served as the Naval assistant to the Chief of the Naval Staff.

Flag rank
On promotion to Flag Rank, Bhalla took over as the Assistant Chief of Personnel (Human Resource Development) (ACOP HRD) at naval headquarters. ACOP is an assistant principal staff officer appointment. On 20 December 2021, he assumed the office of the Flag Officer Commanding Eastern Fleet (FOCEF), taking over from Rear Admiral Tarun Sobti who commanded the Eastern Fleet from February to December 2021. On 26 January 2022, he was awarded the Nao Sena Medal for devotion to duty. As FOCEF, he was the officer in tactical command during the President's Fleet Review (PFR) held in February 2022.

Awards and decorations

See also
 Flag Officer Commanding Eastern Fleet
 Eastern Fleet

References

Indian Navy admirals
Flag Officers Commanding Eastern Fleet
National Defence Academy (India) alumni
Graduates of the Royal College of Defence Studies
Living people
Year of birth missing (living people)
Defence Services Staff College alumni